The Apparition, or Mr. Jones' Comical Experience With a Ghost, also known as The Ghost and the Candle and as Apparitions, is a 1903 French short silent film by Georges Méliès.

Plot
An elderly traveler arrives at an inn. After making a pass at the hotel maid, he sits down and attempts to read by candlelight. To his astonishment, the candle refuses to cooperate, moving around the table and then growing to incredible height. Finally it moves so close that the newspaper catches fire.

From the fire comes an apparition of a woman, with whom the traveler is fascinated. As he kneels to court her, she changes into a grotesque, shrouded ghost, who dances in a blurry haze and walks right through the enraged traveler. The traveler tries to attack the ghost, but only manages to shatter his dinner tray, to the amusement of the hotel staff.

Production
Méliès plays the traveler in the film, which achieves its special effects with a combination of pyrotechnics, soft focus, multiple exposures, and substitution splices.

Release
Le Revenant was sold by Méliès's Star Film Company and is numbered 501–502 in its catalogues. It was sold in the United States as The Apparition, or Mr. Jones' Comical Experience With a Ghost and in Britain as The Ghost and the Candle; a 2008 video release used the title Apparitions.

References

External links
 

French black-and-white films
Films directed by Georges Méliès
French silent short films